Acrocomia crispa, the Cuban belly palm or corojo, a palm species which is endemic to Cuba.  Formerly placed in its own genus, Gastrococos, recent work found that that genus was nested within Acrocomia.   It is a tall, spiny palm with a trunk that is slender at the base, but swollen in the middle, giving it the name "Cuban belly palm" in English.

Description 
Acrocomia crispa is a single-stemmed palm tree with pinnately-compound leaves. Trunks are densely spiny, but becomes smooth and grey as the trunk ages.

Taxonomy
The species was first described by as Cocos crispa by Carl Sigismund Kunth in 1816 based on an incomplete specimen collected by Alexander von Humboldt and Aimé Bonpland. In 1866 Sebastián Alfredo de Morales described Gastrococcus armentalis based on a distinct type species. Although Morales was able to examine the specimen that Kunth's species was based on, he concluded that the two collections represented different species. In 1912, based on Charles Fuller Baker's description, Odoardo Beccari published a formal description Acrocomia crispa, in which he included Kunth's C. cripsa.

References 

crispa
Endemic flora of Cuba
Trees of Cuba
Plants described in 1817
Taxa named by Odoardo Beccari